Ireland competed in the 2008 Summer Olympics, held in Beijing, China. It was the 19th Summer Games that Ireland contested as a nation under the Olympic Council of Ireland.

Medalists

Athletics

16 Irish athletes qualified for 17 different Olympic events in 2008.

Men
Track & road events

Women
Track & road events

Field events

Badminton

Boxing

Ireland qualified five boxers for the Olympic boxing tournament. Barnes became the first when he qualified at the World Championships. Nevin was the second, qualifying at the first European qualifying event. Joyce, Sutherland, and Egan brought the number to five at the 2nd European tournament.

Canoeing

Ireland qualified one competitor in slalom canoeing.  Eoin Rheinisch qualified an Irish boat in slalom kayak event after finishing seventeenth in the 2007 World Championships.  Ireland did not have any competitors in the flatwater events.

Slalom

Cycling

Ireland qualified two places for the road race based on UCI rankings.  Robin Seymour qualified for his third men's cross country race in the mountain biking.  On 18 June 2008, the Olympic Council of Ireland announced that David O'Loughlin had secured a place for the men's individual pursuit in track cycling. Initially, the UCI released a list of qualifiers which did not include O'Loughlin.

Road

Track
Pursuit

Mountain biking

Equestrian

Eventing
Although Ireland did not qualify for the team event in the 2008 Olympics, as a result of having 5 individual riding spots qualify, they were automatically entered into the team event.

# – Indicates that points do not count in team total

Show jumping
As a result of Jessica Kürten's world ranking, Ireland earned one individual place in show jumping at the 2008 games.  As Kürten opted not to ride in the Olympics, the place was awarded to Denis Lynch.

Lynch and his mount Lantinus progressed to the finals stage. However, along with riders and horses from four other finalists, Lynch was suspended from taking part in the final, following a positive test for a banned substance.

Fencing

Ireland qualified one berth in sabre fencing. Siobhan Byrne secured her place in the Olympics by winning silver at the qualifying tournament in Istanbul in April.

Women

Rowing

Ireland qualified with two boats for the rowing events. The men's coxless four qualified for the Olympics by finishing tenth at the 2007 World Championships. The men's lightweight coxless four team also granted their berth by finishing second at the last Olympic qualifying regatta in Poznań in June 2008 to complete the team line-up.

Men

Qualification Legend: FA=Final A (medal); FB=Final B (non-medal); FC=Final C (non-medal); FD=Final D (non-medal); FE=Final E (non-medal); FF=Final F (non-medal); SA/B=Semifinals A/B; SC/D=Semifinals C/D; SE/F=Semifinals E/F; QF=Quarterfinals; R=Repechage

* In the non-medal final, Gearoid Towey had to withdraw due to illness, and was replaced by substitute Richard Coakley. (A spate of illness circulated in the regatta field during the heats and finals, to the extent Germany's lightweight men's four had to withdraw entirely from the semifinal after three crew-members were affected.)

Sailing

Men

Women

Open

M = Medal race; EL = Eliminated – did not advance into the medal race; CAN = Race cancelled

Shooting

Men

Swimming

Men

Women

Qualifiers for the latter rounds of all events are decided on a time only basis, therefore positions shown are overall results versus competitors in all heats.

Triathlon

Connor Farrell became Ireland's first ever Olympic qualifier for the Triathlon after finishing in fifteenth place at the 2008 World Championships, and thereby earning his enough ranking points.

See also
 Ireland at the 2008 Summer Paralympics

References

 Page includes results and scores from the official Beijing Olympic's website.

Nations at the 2008 Summer Olympics
2008
Summer Olympics